Gail O'Rourke Wong (December 23, 1942 – April 3, 2000) was a volleyball player. She played for the United States national team at the 1964 Summer Olympics and was an All-American at Marymount College in Los Angeles.

References

1942 births
2000 deaths
Olympic volleyball players of the United States
Volleyball players at the 1964 Summer Olympics
American women's volleyball players
20th-century American women
20th-century American people
Loyola Marymount Lions women's volleyball players